John Rea Neill (November 12, 1877 – September 19, 1943) was a magazine and children's book illustrator primarily known for illustrating more than forty stories set in the Land of Oz, including L. Frank Baum's, Ruth Plumly Thompson's, and three of his own. His pen-and-ink drawings have become identified almost exclusively with the Oz series. He did a great deal of magazine and newspaper illustration work which is not as well known today.

Early life
Born in Philadelphia, Pennsylvania, John R. Neill did his first illustration work for the Philadelphia's Central High School newspaper in 1894-95. Neill dropped out of Pennsylvania Academy of the Fine Arts after one semester because he said, "they have nothing to teach me".

He then turned to advertising art for the Wanamaker department store in Philadelphia. He became a staff artist of the Philadelphia North American newspaper, for which he produced features like the comics strip Toyland, illustrations for the serialization of 'The Fate of a Crown' (a book by L. Frank Baum), Children's Stories That Never Grow Old, and the Sunday comics page 'The Little Journeys of Nip and Tuck' with verses by W.R. Bradford (1909–1910). He was first commissioned to illustrate The Marvelous Land of Oz, the second Oz book L. Frank Baum wrote, published in 1904; The Wonderful Wizard of Oz had been illustrated by W. W. Denslow, with whom Baum argued and lost contact afterward.

Career
Originally, Neill's illustrations were slightly reminiscent of Denslow's to bring continuity and familiarity to the characters, although Neill's work in this period was far more reminiscent of the work of his contemporary and friend, illustrator Joseph Clement Coll. Denslow's illustrations had been quite popular. However, as the series expanded, Neill brought his own unique flair to the illustrations, showing more artistic representations of the characters as well as beautiful paintings of numerous scenes. In fact, he was later named the Imperial Illustrator of Oz.

Neill's illustrations were published in the leading magazines of the first few decades of the twentieth century, including Collier's, Vanity Fair, The Saturday Evening Post, The Ladies Home Journal, Century, Pictorial Review, The Delineator, Boys' Life, St. Nicholas, The People's Home Journal, Adventure  and many others. In 1930 and 1931, he contributed a great deal of artwork to Argosy.

Dorothy

Dorothy drawn by Denslow appeared to be a chubby five- or six-year-old with long brown hair in two thick braids that remained untied at the ends. Neill chose to illustrate a new Dorothy in 1907 when the character was reintroduced in Ozma of Oz. He illustrated the young girl in a more fashionable appearance. She is shown to be about ten years old, dressed in contemporary American fashions, with blonde hair cut in a fashionable bob. A similar modernization was given other female characters.

Oz work
Neill continued to illustrate the Oz books after Baum's death, and his artwork was praised for helping give Ruth Plumly Thompson's books "legitimacy" in the eyes of Baum's fans. Neill would eventually succeed Thompson as the designated "Oz historian" and write several books himself.

The Wonder City of Oz, The Scalawagons of Oz, and Lucky Bucky in Oz, which debuted each year from 1940 to 1942, were written by Neill for the firm of Reilly & Lee and are considered part of the Famous Forty. His last work, The Runaway in Oz, was drafted before his death, but the full illustrations were never finished and Reilly & Lee decided not to publish the manuscript. However, Neill's widow kept the manuscript safe, and, in 1995, it was finally published by Books of Wonder and edited and illustrated by Eric Shanower. The book's design reproduces the design used throughout almost all of the Baum, Thompson, and Neill Oz books (without the color plates), and the story itself follows the adventures of the Patchwork Girl with some new characters invented by Neill.

Non-Oz work
Neill illustrated dozens of books that were not written by Baum.  One of the most notable of Neill's non-Baum books was his adaptation of Helen Bannerman's 1899 story, Little Black Sambo.  Neill's edition of Little Black Sambo, which was published by Reilly and Britton in 1908, included a short story called "The Story of Topsy from Uncle Tom's Cabin."

Legacy

In 2018, "The Lost Art of Oz" project was initiated to locate and catalogue the surviving original artwork John R. Neill, W.W. Denslow, Frank Kramer, Richard 'Dirk' Gringhuis and Dick Martin created to illustrate the Oz book series.

References

External links

  – maintained by granddaughter Jory Neill Mason, (c) 2015 John R Neill Illustrator
Biographical information on John R. Neill
Original John R. Neill artwork from the Oz books on www.lostartofoz.com
Piglet Press entry on Neill
Pulp Artists entry on Neill
 
 
 

1877 births
1943 deaths
American children's book illustrators
Oz (franchise)
Artists from Philadelphia
Art Nouveau illustrators